Calcutta is a 1947 American film noir crime film directed by John Farrow, and written and produced by Seton I. Miller.  The drama features Alan Ladd, Gail Russell and William Bendix.

Plot
In post-World War II Asia, three American pilots, Neale Gordon (Alan Ladd), Bill Cunningham (John Whitney) and Pedro Blake (William Bendix) fly a route from Chungking, China to Calcutta, India. They live at the Hotel Imperial in Calcutta. When Neale and Pedro's aircraft is forced down in a mountainous area, Bill comes to the rescue.

Bill's fiancée, Virginia Moore (Gail Russell), at an engagement party tells Neale and Pedro that Bill has been strangled. Nightclub singer Marina Tanev (June Duprez) says Eric Lasser (Lowell Gilmore), the nightclub owner canceled the engagement party on the night Bill was killed. Tearing an expensive diamond necklace from her neck, Neale confronts Virginia making her confess she was not in love with Bill.

During a flight to Chungking, Pedro meets Indian merchant Mul Raj Malik (Paul Singh) who tells him to visit him at his import-export shop. In Calcutta, Mrs. Smith (Edith King), a jewellery merchant reveals Bill bought Virginia's necklace and deposited a $7,000 check before he died. Neale is still wary of Virginia's involvement in his friend's death and when he discovers a bag of jewels in the floorboards of one of their aircraft, he has to fight for his life.

Giving the jewels to Pedro, Neale returns to the hotel, hoping to catch the smugglers but Malik confronts him but is shot as he leaves the room. When Neale shows a jewelled brooch to Marina, she warns that Virginia knows more about the night Bill died. Going to her room, Neale finds it has been ransacked and Virginia is missing.

British police officers led by Inspector Hendricks (Gavin Muir) arrive to arrest Neale for Malik's murder. Pedro claims the gun that was used in Malik's murder was his. Neale is released and he pledges that he will find the real killer. Virginia contacts Neale and tells him she loves him, but he is still suspicious of her motives. When the hotel desk clerk (Benson Fong) who was there the night Bill was murdered contradicts Virginia's story, Neale wrings the truth out of her. She was part of the smuggling ring, with her role to get close to the pilots who were flying in and out of Calcutta, until Bill got wise to the scheme. She held a gun to Bill's temple but it was Lasser who strangled him.

Lasser bursts in, and Virginia tries to shoot him but is disarmed by Neale who kills Lasser during their struggle for the gun. Neale then calls in Hendricks who arrests Virginia, still professing her love for Neale. Later, when Marina goes to the airport, she tells Neale that tangling with mountains is safer than his dealing with women. The two embrace and kiss with Neale then setting off on his next flight.

Cast

 Alan Ladd as Neale Gordon
 Gail Russell as Virginia Moore
 William Bendix as Pedro Blake
 June Duprez as Marina Tanev
 Lowell Gilmore as Eric Lasser
 Edith King as Mrs. Smith
 Paul Singh as Mul Raj Malik
 Gavin Muir as Inspector Kendricks
 John Whitney as Bill Cunningham
 Benson Fong as Young Chinese Clerk

Production
Calcutta had frequently been in the news with reports of the war and Paramount decided it would make an ideal setting for a film. Production of the movie was announced in late 1944. It was based on an original story by Seton Miller who also acted as screenwriter and producer.

Alan Ladd and William Bendix, who had just appeared in Two Years Before the Mast for Miller, were announced as stars, playing pilots who flew over the "hump" from Calcutta to Chungking. Howard da Silva, who had co-starred several times with Ladd, was announced as a co-star but ended up not being cast. John Farrow, who had made two films with Ladd, was chosen to direct.

Filming took place in June and July 1945. Four people were hired as special technical advisers: Joe Rosbert (a member of the Flying Tigers who crashed on "the hump"), Major Whyte (a veteran of the Eighth Burma Rifles), Mrs Madge Schofield (a former resident of Calcutta) and Dr Singh (a resident Hollywood expert on Indian affairs); the last two had small roles in the film. Of the other cast members, June Duprez had suffered a career slump since moving to Hollywood following her appearance in The Thief of Bagdad but had been restored to some popularity since appearing in None But the Lonely Heart. Gail Russell had previously made Salty O'Rourke with Ladd. John Witney was from Little Theatre and was a protege of Alan Ladd. Edith King, who had just appeared in Broadway in Othello, made her film debut. 200 Indian seamen from the British Indian Navy were used as extras.

Reception
Although the film was made in mid 1945, it was not released until April 1947. In between then Paramount made and released the Ladd vehicle O.S.S. (1946).

Critical response
When the film was first released, The New York Times film critic Thomas M. Pryor, gave the film a mixed review, writing:
There is just so much that an actor can do on his own to make a character interesting and then he must depend upon the scenarist to provide him with dialogue and situations which will keep the spectator on edge. In Calcutta, which opened yesterday at the Paramount. Alan Ladd is going through an all-too-familiar exercise. While the actor is giving a competent performance and is nicely abetted by William Bendix, the story by Seton I. Miller, who also produced the film for Paramount, is a sorry mess indeed.
The critic from the Los Angeles Times called the film "atmospheric and interest-holding" but thought that Gail Russell was miscast.

More recently, film critic Dennis Schwartz gave Calcutta a positive review, writing:
John Farrow's Calcutta is a fast-paced old-fashioned adventure yarn, shot entirely in Paramount's backlot. Seton Miller does the screenplay. It's an entertaining potboiler, though a minor work ... Ladd gives an icy action-hero performance as someone who revels in his disdain for women as untrustworthy companions. By Ladd's politically incorrect moves, he takes on the characteristics of the film noir protagonist--which gives this programmer its energy. Ladd quotes an ancient Hindu saying 'Man who trust woman walk on duckweed over pond,' which tells us all we want to know about how he has stayed alive for so long while in the company of dangerous women, ones like Virginia, while Bill so easily succumbed to the beauty of the femme fatale.

Noir analysis
According to Bob Porfirio, a professor of American studies and film studies,
When Ladd rips a pendant from her neck or slaps her around, it makes him appear all the more impervious to women.  Their interaction holds this film together and demonstrates the misogynistic strain of hard-boiled fiction; it is a strain implicit in much of post-war American society as well.

Adaptation
On February 9, 1950, The Screen Guild Theater, broadcast a 30 minute radio adaptation of the film with Alan Ladd and Gail Russell reprising their film roles.

References

Notes

Bibliography

 Silver, Alain and Elizabeth Ward, eds. Film Noir: An Encyclopedic Reference to the American Style, 3rd edition, 1992. Woodstock, New York: The Overlook Press, 1992. .

External links
 
 
 
 
 
 

1947 films
1947 crime drama films
American aviation films
American crime drama films
American crime thriller films
American black-and-white films
Film noir
Films scored by Victor Young
Films set in the British Raj
Films set in Kolkata
Paramount Pictures films
1940s crime thriller films
Films directed by John Farrow
1940s English-language films
1940s American films